Jean Davy (15 October 1911 – 5 February 2001) was a French film, stage voice actor.

Career
He was a Sociétaire of the Comédie-Française.

In the premiere production of Antigone in Paris, 1944, Davy created the role of Créon.

He was a French voice of Charlton Heston (The Ten Commandments, The Three Musketeers, The Four Musketeers...), Errol Flynn, Orson Welles and Robert Taylor.

Filmography
L'équipage (1935)
Mayerling (1936)
La maison du Maltais (1938)
Remontons les Champs-Élysées (1938)
L'homme qui joue avec le feu (1942)
Le Destin fabuleux de Désirée Clary (1942)
Une étoile au soleil (1943)
La Main du diable (1943)
Mon amour est près de toi (1943)
 First on the Rope (1944)
Farandole (1945)
Le mystère Saint-Val (1945)
 The Last Judgment (1945)
Alone in the Night (1945)
Special Mission (1946)
 Criminal Brigade (1947)
Vertiges (1947)
La grande Maguet (1947)
Une mort sans importance (1948)
Judicial Error (1948)
Le Destin exécrable de Guillemette Babin (1948)
La louve (1949)
La femme nue (1949)
Au royaume des cieux (1949)
On ne triche pas avec la vie (1949)
Cartouche, roi de Paris (1950)
Souvenirs perdus (1950)
Le vrai coupable (1951)
Sainte Jeanne (1956) (TV)
C'était un gentleman (1957) (TV)
Christine (1958)
Drôles de phénomènes (1959)
Le juge de Malte (1959) (TV)
Le Masque de fer (1962)
La princesse du rail (1967) (TV series)
La bouquetière des innocents (1967) (TV)
Le profanateur (1969) (TV)
Tête d'horloge (1970) (TV)
Noëlle aux quatre vents (TV series)
La Polonaise (1971)
Le complot (1973)
Eugène Sue (1974) (TV)
Stavisky (1974)
Julie Charles (1974)
Un jeune homme seul (1974)
L'homme au contrat (1974) (TV series)
Ces grappes de ma vigne (1975) (miniseries)
Faux et usage de faux (1976) (TV series)
Les jeunes filles (1977) (TV)
Le diable dans la boîte (1977)
Foch pour vaincre (1977) (TV)
La lettre écarlate (1977) (TV)
Il était un musicien (1978) (TV series)
Zigzags (1978) (TV)
Othello (1979) (TV)
Le destin de Priscilla Davies (1979) (TV)
La lumière des justes (1979) (miniseries)
Les yeux bleus (1979) (miniseries)
Bernard Quesnay (1979) (TV)
Le mandarin (1980) (TV)
La fraîcheur de l'aube (1980) (TV)
L'inconnue d'Arras (1980) (TV)
La provinciale (1981)
Anthelme Collet ou Le brigand gentillhomme (1981) (miniseries)
Histoire contemporaine (1981) (miniseries)
Ursule Mirouët (1981) (TV)
Le procès de Shamgorod (1982) (TV)
Deux amies d'enfance (1983) (miniseries)
Dessin sur un trottoir (1983) (TV)
L'homme de Suez (1983) (miniseries)
Les maîtres du soleil (1984)
Au théâtre ce soir (1984) (TV)
Châteauvallon (1985) (TV)

References

External links
 

1911 births
2001 deaths
French male film actors
French male voice actors
Sociétaires of the Comédie-Française
People from Puteaux
French male stage actors
20th-century French male actors